The 46th parallel south is a circle of latitude that is 46 degrees south of the Earth's equatorial plane. It crosses the Atlantic Ocean, the Indian Ocean, Australasia, the Pacific Ocean and South America.

At this latitude the sun is visible for 15 hours, 45 minutes during the December solstice and 8 hours, 38 minutes during the June solstice.

The largest city south of the 46th parallel is Punta Arenas.

Around the world
Starting at the Prime Meridian and heading eastwards, the parallel 46° south passes through:

{| class="wikitable plainrowheaders"
! scope="col" width="125" | Co-ordinates
! scope="col" | Country, territory or ocean
! scope="col" | Notes
|-
| style="background:#b0e0e6;" | 
! scope="row" style="background:#b0e0e6;" | Atlantic Ocean
| style="background:#b0e0e6;" |
|-valign="top"
| style="background:#b0e0e6;" | 
! scope="row" style="background:#b0e0e6;" | Indian Ocean
| style="background:#b0e0e6;" | Passing between Île aux Cochons and Îlots des Apôtres in the Crozet Islands, 
|-
| style="background:#b0e0e6;" | 
! scope="row" style="background:#b0e0e6;" | Pacific Ocean
| style="background:#b0e0e6;" | Tasman Sea
|-
| 
! scope="row" | 
| Fiordland, passing through Lake Hauroko and Chalky Sound; Southland Region, close to the townships of Nightcaps and Mandeville; Otago Region, passing south of the city of Dunedin, close to the townships of Waitahuna and Henley
|-
| style="background:#b0e0e6;" | 
! scope="row" style="background:#b0e0e6;" | Pacific Ocean
| style="background:#b0e0e6;" |
|-
| 
! scope="row" | 
| Taitao Peninsula, Moraleda Channel, also passes near Balmaceda, Aysén Region
|-valign="top"
| 
! scope="row" | 
| Border between Chubut Province and Santa Cruz ProvincePasses near Comodoro Rivadavia, Chubut Province
|-
| style="background:#b0e0e6;" | 
! scope="row" style="background:#b0e0e6;" | Atlantic Ocean
| style="background:#b0e0e6;" |
|}

See also
45th parallel south
47th parallel south

s46
Borders of Argentina